Nothoapiole is a phenylpropene, a natural organic compound present in the essential oil of Perilla frutescens from Jeju Island in Korea and the major component of the essential oil obtained from the roots of Pleurospermum angelicoides Benth. It is also found in the essential oil of black caraway (Carum bulbocastanum) fruits and Carum nigrum.

This highly oxygenated phenylpropanoid, previously reported in a few Carum species, is structurally and biogenetically related to myristicin, apiole and dillapiole.

See also 
 Elemicin
 Myristicin
 Apiole
 Dillapiole

References 

Phenylpropenes
O-methylated phenylpropanoids
Benzodioxoles
Allyl compounds